Pločnik is a village in the municipality of Prokuplje, Toplica District, Republic of Serbia. According to the 2002 population census, it's populated by 182, all of whom declared Serbs.

History

Chalcolithic copper smelting
Not long ago, published in 2007, an important European-archaeology excavation site was found in Pločnik. At this site, and in Belovode, archaeologists have found the earliest current evidence of copper smelting, dating from between 5500 BCE and 5000 BCE. This shows that the Copper Age started 500 years earlier than previously thought, and probably somewhere near this region.

Dog domestication
In November 2020 it was announced that the bones of the 6500 old female dog found at the site in Pločnik by the University College London and the local Museum of Toplica crew show proof of Middle Eastern domestication, as one of the five branches of ancient canine-wolf common species that, along with the Siberian branches, gave rise to the modern dog.

Medieval Ottoman invasion
It was the site of the historically notable 1386 Battle of Pločnik. Ottoman Sultan Murad I led a sizable Turkish army in an invasion of Serbia. Serbian Prince Lazar Hrebeljanović led the Serbian army to intercept him. The Ottoman army suffered a defeat. However, though beaten, the Turkish forces were still strong enough to conquer Niš from the Prince on their return.

References

Populated places in Toplica District
Vinča culture
1927 archaeological discoveries